Kritsakorn Kerdpol (born January 21, 1985) is a professional footballer from Thailand He is the currently goalkeeper coach Thai League 2 club Samut Prakan City.

Honours

Club
PEA F.C.
 Thai League T1 Champions (1) : 2008

External links
Profile at Thaipremierleague.co.th
http://int.soccerway.com/players/kritsakorn-kerdpol/288055/

1985 births
Living people
Kritsakorn Kerdpol
Kritsakorn Kerdpol
Association football goalkeepers
Kritsakorn Kerdpol
Kritsakorn Kerdpol
Kritsakorn Kerdpol
Kritsakorn Kerdpol
Kritsakorn Kerdpol
Kritsakorn Kerdpol
Kritsakorn Kerdpol
Kritsakorn Kerdpol